Massimo Magnani (born 4 October 1951 in Ferrara) is a former Italian marathon runner.

He has the Italian best performance of the 30 km, established in 1982.

Biography
Massimo Magnani participated at two edition of the Summer Olympics (1976 and 1980), he has 10 caps in national team from 1974 to 1985. He was technic commissioner of the Italy national athletics team till 2016.

Achievements

National titles
Massimo Magnani has won 3 times the individual national championship.
2 wins in half marathon (1978, 1981)
1 win in marathon (1978)

See also
Italian records in athletics

References

External links
 

1951 births
Living people
Italian male marathon runners
Athletes (track and field) at the 1976 Summer Olympics
Athletes (track and field) at the 1980 Summer Olympics
Olympic athletes of Italy
Sportspeople from Ferrara